Liam Thomas Green (born 17 March 1988) is an English footballer.

Green made two substitute appearances in League One for Doncaster Rovers, before being released in May 2007. He signed for Boston United in July 2007.

He made 69 appearances in all competitions for the Pilgrims (scoring once). He then signed for Ilkeston Town, making 38 appearances in all competitions. When Ilkeston Town were liquidated he joined Corby Town, where he made five appearances. He returned to the New Manor Ground to join Ilkeston, the successor club to Ilkeston Town, where he made 26 appearances, scoring once.

Notes

External links

1985 births
Living people
Footballers from Grimsby
English footballers
Association football midfielders
Doncaster Rovers F.C. players
Boston United F.C. players
Ilkeston Town F.C. (1945) players
Corby Town F.C. players
Ilkeston F.C. players